Red Wine & Blue (RWB) is a 501(c)(4) organization founded by Katie Paris after the 2018 midterm election. Operating out of suburban swing districts in the United States, RWB engages women at a grassroots level and drives media narratives to better reflect issues faced by the "everyday woman".

The organization manages a weekly podcast, a 215,000-member Facebook group, SWEEP (Suburban Women Engaged, Empowered, and Pissed), and publishes a weekly newsletter, The Cul-de-sac.

History

Founding 
Red Wine & Blue began its organizing efforts in 2019 with a plan to engage “concerned but unconnected” suburban voters in local races across Ohio. Paris told Buzzfeed News at the time that the group was using these local campaigns to build a roadmap for Democrats to win back Ohio in the 2020 presidential election.

By 2020, a dozen groups in 12 suburban Ohio counties joined the Red Wine & Blue network, and the group began to hold in-person rallies. They also hosted Facebook Live conversations with Ohio Congressional candidates and participated in a friend-to-friend texting program to turnout the vote.

Red Wine & Blue continued their organizing in Ohio following the 2020 elections. In 2021, the group held a read-in at the State Board of Education to counterprotest an anti-critical race theory demonstration, and called on Ohio REALTORS to stop financially supporting Republican state lawmakers that backed a legislative ban on teaching "divisive concepts" in K–12 schools.

National expansion 
The same year, Red Wine & Blue announced its intended expansion in Arizona, Georgia, North Carolina, Pennsylvania, and Wisconsin while still maintaining a presence in its headquarters state.

References 

Democratic Party (United States) organizations
Progressive organizations in the United States